Herb Magee (born June 20, 1941), commonly referred to as the Shot Doctor, is an American former men's college basketball coach, who coached for 54 seasons at NCAA Division II Thomas Jefferson University. The school was established in its current form when Philadelphia University, Magee's alma mater, merged with the original Thomas Jefferson University in 2017.  The former Philadelphia University was known as Philadelphia College of Textiles & Science and athletically branded as "Philadelphia Textile" when Magee first became head coach in 1967, becoming Philadelphia University in 1999.  He has spent 54 years as head coach, and 62 years as either a player or coach at the school as of 2021. In 2015, he achieved his 1,000th win as a head coach, becoming one of only four college coaches to achieve that milestone.  On August 12, 2011, Magee was inducted into the Naismith Memorial Basketball Hall of Fame.

Career

Playing
Magee, an Irish American, played his high school basketball at Philadelphia's famed West Catholic High, where his teammates included former Philadelphia 76ers head coach Jim Lynam and former St. Joseph's coach Jim Boyle.

As a five-foot-ten inch, 150-pound player for the Philadelphia Rams, Magee scored 2,235 points (before the introduction of the 3-point shot), leading his team to 75 victories. Magee was a two-time All-American and drafted by the Boston Celtics (the 62nd pick of the 1963 NBA draft). However, he broke his fingers before training camp, and opted instead to return to his alma mater as an assistant coach under Buckey Harris. When Harris retired in 1967, Magee became head coach at the age of 25. He has spent his entire adult life at the East Falls school as either a player, assistant coach, or head coach.

Accomplishments
Magee has earned many awards during his coaching career.  The Kodak District Coach of the Year in 1993, Magee was also tabbed New York Collegiate Athletic Conference Coach of the Year that season and again in 1994. In addition, he has been honored as regional Coach of the Year four times, national Coach of the Year twice, and Co-Coach of the Year in the Mideast Collegiate Conference twice. He was also inducted into the Pennsylvania Sports Hall of Fame in 1979.  He led the Rams to the College Division National Championship in 1970.

Coach Magee was inducted into the Philadelphia Sports Hall of Fame (2008), Pennsylvania Sports Hall of Fame (1979), Philadelphia University and West Catholic High School Halls of Fame, and honored by numerous organizations throughout his career.  He coached the Olympic Festive team along with John Calipari and was co-coach of the Year in the Mideast Collegiate Conference (twice).  The NABC honored him with the Guardian of the Game Award. Coach Magee was awarded the honorary degree Doctor of Humane Letters by President Stephen Spinelli Jr. at Philadelphia University's 125th Commencement on May 17, 2009 in recognition of his accomplishments and years of dedication and service. Known as "shot Doctor" because of his ability to teach basketball shot-making through unforgettable clinics held thousands of times during his career. In one such clinic, he parked his car, entered onto the court and without any warmup, hit 25 in a row from the top of the key.

Magee received a Bachelor of Science in marketing from Philadelphia University in 1963 and a Master's in Education from St. Joseph's University in 1969.

On September 7, 2021, Magee announced that he would retire following the 2021-22 season.

Head coaching record

Personal life
Magee has been married twice and has two daughters.

See also
 List of college men's basketball coaches with 600 wins

References
General

Footnotes

External links
 
 

1941 births
Living people
American men's basketball players
American people of Irish descent
Basketball coaches from Pennsylvania
Basketball players from Philadelphia
Boston Celtics draft picks
College men's basketball head coaches in the United States
Philadelphia Rams men's basketball coaches
Philadelphia Rams men's basketball players
Naismith Memorial Basketball Hall of Fame inductees
Saint Joseph's University alumni